Notes from San Francisco is a posthumous album by Irish musician Rory Gallagher. Released in 2011, It consists of two CDs. The first disc is a never-released studio album that Gallagher recorded in San Francisco in December 1977.  The album was to be a major shift for Gallagher. Rather than producing it himself, he worked with Elliot Mazer a successful producer who had a long track record with artists such as Bob Dylan, Janis Joplin and The Band. At the last minute—causing great distress to his manager and brother Dónal and to his record company—Gallagher decided to just pull the record.  In an interview, Gallagher stated "it wasn't because of the material or the musicians or anything like that. It was a song thing that I didn't think on the technical side everything worked. So I scrapped the thing". After scrapping the album Gallagher reworked his band firing all the musicians except the bass player and hiring a new drummer. This new Gallagher power trio re-recorded some the San Francisco songs, and some others, with Gallagher producing and released them as Photo-Finish.  Shortly before his death, Rory reportedly gave Dónal permission to eventually release the original San Francisco versions of the songs if they were remixed. Dónal had his son Daniel remix the songs in 2011. The second disc is a live performance also recorded in San Francisco in December 1979.

Track listing
All songs composed by Rory Gallagher

Disc one
 "Rue the Day" - 4:26
 "Persuasion" - 4:45
 "B Girl" - 4:42
 "Mississippi Sheiks" – 5:56
 "Wheels within Wheels" - 3:40
 "Overnight Bag" – 4:46
 "Cruise On Out" – 5:19
 "Brute Force & Ignorance" – 5:45
 "Fuel to the Fire" - 5:43
 "Wheels within Wheels Alt. Version" - 3:55
 "Cut a Dash" - 3:49
 "Out on the Tiles" - 4:22
Disc two
 "Follow Me" (from Top Priority) – 6:25
 "Shinkicker" (from Photo-Finish) – 3:42
 "Off the Handle" (from Top Priority) – 7:01
 "Bought and Sold" (from Against the Grain) - 4:43
 "I'm Leavin'" - 4:35
 "Tattoo'd Lady" (from Tattoo) - 6:49
 "Do You Read Me" (from Calling Card) - 6:11
 "Country Mile" (from Calling Card) - 3:51
 "Calling Card" (from Calling Card) - 5:51
 "Shadow Play" (from Photo-Finish) - 5:11
 "Bullfrog Blues" (from Live in Europe) - 5:38
 "Sea Cruise" - 3:29

Personnel
Rory Gallagher – guitar, vocals, and harmonica
Gerry McAvoy – bass guitar
Rod de'Ath – drums
Lou Martin – keyboards
Ted McKenna – drums
Martin Fiero – saxophone
Joe O'Donnell – violin

References

External links
Information at rorygallagher.com
Photo-Finish Tour Interview with Mark Stevens at rorygallagher.com
 Review by Doug Collette at All About Jazz

Rory Gallagher albums
2011 albums
Albums produced by Elliot Mazer
Music of the San Francisco Bay Area